Aethriamanta is a genus of dragonflies in the family Libellulidae.
Species of Aethriamanta are found in Madagascar, through Southeast Asia, Indonesia, New Guinea and northern Australia.

Species
This genus Aethriamanta includes the following species:

References

Libellulidae
Anisoptera genera
Odonata of Africa
Odonata of Asia
Odonata of Australia
Taxa named by William Forsell Kirby
Insects described in 1889
Taxonomy articles created by Polbot